Achraf Ouchen (Arabic أشرف أشن, born 1 November 1997), is a Moroccan Karateka athlete who competes in the heavyweight division.

Background 
Originally from Nador in north-east Morocco

Career 
His biggest success is the silver medal of the 2016 World Karate Championships in Linz, Austria.

In 2017, he lost the bronze medal match in the men's Kumite +84 kg event at the 2017 World Games held in Wrocław, Poland.

He competes in the full-contact Karate league Karate Combat in the heavyweight division.

Personal life
he was congratulated by Mohammed VI of Morocco for winning gold at the 2015 U21 World Championships.

Achievements 

2019
  12th African Games - Rabat (MAR) - Kumite +84 kg

2016
  23rd World Karate Championships - Linz (AUT) - Kumite +84 kg

2015
  9th World Junior, Cadet and U21 Championships - Jakarta (INA) - U21 Kumite +84 kg

2013
  8th World Junior, Cadet and U21 Championships - Guadalajara 2013 (ESP) - Junior Kumite +76 kg

References 

1997 births
Moroccan male karateka
Living people
Competitors at the 2019 African Games
African Games medalists in karate
African Games gold medalists for Morocco
Competitors at the 2017 World Games
21st-century Moroccan people